The Back Bone Seraph (a seraph is a type of angel) is a family of French paramotors that was designed by Thierry Simonet and produced by Back Bone of Tallard for powered paragliding. Now out of production, when it was available the aircraft was supplied complete and ready-to-fly.

Design and development
The Seraph was designed to comply with the US FAR 103 Ultralight Vehicles rules as well as European regulations. It features a paraglider-style wing, single-place accommodation and a single engine in pusher configuration. Each model in the line is named for its metric propeller diameter.

As is the case with all paramotors, take-off and landing is accomplished by foot. Inflight steering is accomplished via handles that actuate the canopy brakes, creating roll and yaw.

Variants
Seraph 100
Model with a  RDM 100 engine in pusher configuration with a 4:1 ratio reduction drive and a  diameter two-bladed wooden propeller.
Seraph 113
Model with a  RDM 100 engine in pusher configuration with a 4:1 ratio reduction drive and a  diameter two-bladed wooden propeller.
Seraph 115
Model with a  RDM 100 engine in pusher configuration with a 4:1 ratio reduction drive and a  diameter two-bladed wooden propeller.

Specifications (Seraph 100)

References

Seraph
2000s French ultralight aircraft
Single-engined pusher aircraft
Paramotors